Mamia Jikia (born 11 December 1975 in Poti) is a retired Georgian footballer (midfielder). He is a former member of Georgia national football team. He was connected mostly years of his career with Ruch Chorzów. He came to Poland in 1997 from FC Odishi Zugdidi. In his career he also played for Linzer ASK. 
The last club before he joined Ruch Chorzów in the winter 2007 was ŁKS Łódź.

External links
 

1975 births
Living people
Footballers from Georgia (country)
Expatriate footballers from Georgia (country)
Expatriate footballers in Austria
Expatriate footballers in Poland
Ekstraklasa players
LASK players
Ruch Chorzów players
Amica Wronki players
Wisła Płock players
ŁKS Łódź players
Georgia (country) international footballers
FC Zugdidi players
Expatriate sportspeople from Georgia (country) in Poland
Association football midfielders